Lake June in Winter Scrub State Park is a Florida State Park, located approximately seven miles southwest of Lake Placid. This park occupies the entire western shore of Lake June in Winter.

Admission and Hours
There is a $2.00 per vehicle entrance fee. Florida state parks are open between 8 a.m. and sundown every day of the year (including holidays).

Gallery

External links
 Lake June-in-Winter Scrub Preserve State Park at Florida State Parks
 Lake June in Winter Scrub State Park at State Parks
 Lake June in Winter Scrub State Park at Wildernet

State parks of Florida
Parks in Highlands County, Florida